Orshanka is the name of two inhabited localities in the Mari El Republic of Russia:
Orshanka, Orshansky District, Mari El Republic, an urban locality (an urban-type settlement) in Orshansky District
Orshanka, Sovetsky District, Mari El Republic, a rural locality (a village) in Sovetsky District